Haverford North is a neighborhood in the West Philadelphia section of Philadelphia, Pennsylvania. It is located north of Haverford Avenue, east of 44th Street, south and west of Lancaster Avenue, and west of 40th Street. The neighborhood borders Mantua, Dunlap, and Powelton Village according to Google Maps.

References

Neighborhoods in Philadelphia